Nicolae Gh. Lupu (24 February 1884, in Arsura, Vaslui County, Romania – 30 April 1966, in Bucharest) was a Romanian physician. In 1948, he was elected a titular member of the Romanian Academy.

After completing his studies at the Faculty of Medicine of the University of Bucharest, Lupu worked from 1907 to 1913 in the experimental medicine lab of Dr. Ioan Cantacuzino.  In 1931 he is appointed professor at the section of anatomical pathology of the Faculty of Medicine, and in 1936 he is named professor at Filantropia Hospital.

Notes

1884 births
1966 deaths
Titular members of the Romanian Academy
20th-century Romanian educators
20th-century Romanian physicians
People from Vaslui County
University of Bucharest alumni
Academic staff of the University of Bucharest